Joseph R. D'Cruz is a professor of strategic management at the University of Toronto's Rotman School of Management. D'Cruz has worked with the University of Toronto since 1979. Amongst other various positions, D'Cruz has held the title of Academic Co-Director of the Advanced Health Leadership Program since 2007, and Academic Director of the Health Care Executive Programs since 2001. D'Cruz was also the Murray B. Koffler Chair between 2003 and 2006.

Degrees
D'Cruz has earned the following academic degrees, listed in order of certification:
1963 - Bachelor of Arts, University of the Punjab
1965 - Master of Business Administration, University of Karachi
1979 - Doctor of Business Administration, Harvard University

References

External links
D'Cruz's Curriculum Vitae

Living people
Pakistani emigrants to Canada
Canadian academics of Pakistani descent
Academic staff of the University of Toronto
Harvard Business School alumni
University of the Punjab alumni
University of Karachi alumni
Year of birth missing (living people)